In six-dimensional geometry, a runcinated 5-simplex is a convex uniform 5-polytope with 3rd order truncations (Runcination) of the regular 5-simplex.

There are 4 unique runcinations of the 5-simplex with permutations of truncations, and cantellations.

Runcinated 5-simplex

Alternate names 
 Runcinated hexateron
 Small prismated hexateron (Acronym: spix) (Jonathan Bowers)

Coordinates 

The vertices of the runcinated 5-simplex can be most simply constructed on a hyperplane in 6-space as permutations of (0,0,1,1,1,2) or of (0,1,1,1,2,2), seen as facets of a runcinated 6-orthoplex, or a biruncinated 6-cube respectively.

Images

Runcitruncated 5-simplex

Alternate names 
 Runcitruncated hexateron
 Prismatotruncated hexateron (Acronym: pattix) (Jonathan Bowers)

Coordinates 
The coordinates can be made in 6-space, as 180 permutations of:
 (0,0,1,1,2,3)

This construction exists as one of 64 orthant facets of the runcitruncated 6-orthoplex.

Images

Runcicantellated 5-simplex

Alternate names 
 Runcicantellated hexateron
 Biruncitruncated 5-simplex/hexateron
 Prismatorhombated hexateron (Acronym: pirx) (Jonathan Bowers)

Coordinates 
The coordinates can be made in 6-space, as 180 permutations of:
 (0,0,1,2,2,3)

This construction exists as one of 64 orthant facets of the runcicantellated 6-orthoplex.

Images

Runcicantitruncated 5-simplex

Alternate names 
 Runcicantitruncated hexateron
 Great prismated hexateron (Acronym: gippix) (Jonathan Bowers)

Coordinates 
The coordinates can be made in 6-space, as 360 permutations of:
 (0,0,1,2,3,4)

This construction exists as one of 64 orthant facets of the runcicantitruncated 6-orthoplex.

Images

Related uniform 5-polytopes 
These polytopes are in a set of 19 uniform 5-polytopes based on the [3,3,3,3] Coxeter group, all shown here in A5 Coxeter plane orthographic projections. (Vertices are colored by projection overlap order, red, orange, yellow, green, cyan, blue, purple having progressively more vertices)

Notes

References 
 H.S.M. Coxeter: 
 H.S.M. Coxeter, Regular Polytopes, 3rd Edition, Dover New York, 1973 
 Kaleidoscopes: Selected Writings of H.S.M. Coxeter, edited by F. Arthur Sherk, Peter McMullen, Anthony C. Thompson, Asia Ivic Weiss, Wiley-Interscience Publication, 1995,  
 (Paper 22) H.S.M. Coxeter, Regular and Semi Regular Polytopes I, [Math. Zeit. 46 (1940) 380-407, MR 2,10]
 (Paper 23) H.S.M. Coxeter, Regular and Semi-Regular Polytopes II, [Math. Zeit. 188 (1985) 559-591]
 (Paper 24) H.S.M. Coxeter, Regular and Semi-Regular Polytopes III, [Math. Zeit. 200 (1988) 3-45]
 Norman Johnson Uniform Polytopes, Manuscript (1991)
 N.W. Johnson: The Theory of Uniform Polytopes and Honeycombs, Ph.D. 
  x3o3o3x3o - spidtix, x3x3o3x3o - pattix, x3o3x3x3o - pirx, x3x3x3x3o - gippix

External links 
 
 Polytopes of Various Dimensions, Jonathan Bowers
 Runcinated uniform polytera (spid), Jonathan Bowers
 Multi-dimensional Glossary

5-polytopes